Colleen McMahon (born July 18, 1951) is a Senior United States district judge of the United States District Court for the Southern District of New York.

Education and career

Born in Columbus, Ohio, McMahon received a Bachelor of Arts degree from Ohio State University in 1973 and a Juris Doctor from Harvard Law School in 1976. She was in private practice in New York City from 1976 to 1995, except for a period from 1979 to 1980 when she was a speechwriter and special assistant to Donald McHenry, the United States Permanent Representative to the United Nations. She was a Judge of the New York Court of Claims, New York Supreme Court, from 1995 to 1998.

Federal judicial service

On May 21, 1998, McMahon was nominated by President Bill Clinton to a seat  on the United States District Court for the Southern District of New York vacated by John F. Keenan. McMahon was confirmed by the United States Senate on October 21, 1998, and received her commission on October 22, 1998. She was the Chief Judge from June 1, 2016 to April 10, 2021. On April 1, 2021, McMahon announced her intention to assume senior status on April 10, 2021.

Notable cases

Among the cases over which she has presided is a defamation case brought by Drug Enforcement Administration agents against the makers of the film American Gangster, which was alleged to have portrayed such agents as being corrupt.

She was also the Judge in the case of the so-called Newburgh four involving FBI agent Robert Fuller who was the handler of the informant in the case,  Shahed Hussain. In that case, at sentencing she pointed out that the FBI played a key role. She said:  "It created acts of terrorism out of his fantasies of bravado and bigotry, and then made those fantasies come true." And she added: "Only the government could have made a terrorist out of Mr. Cromitie, whose buffoonery is positively Shakespearean in scope."

On December 16, 2021, Judge McMahon ruled that a bankruptcy judge did not have authority to give the Sackler family immunity in civil liability cases related to their involvement in Purdue Pharma.

On Friday, February 3, 2023, Judge McMahon f-bombed the New York City Department of Corrections for failure to promptly provide information on the identities of staffers who may be involved in allegations regarding a class action lawsuit over conditions and illegal detentions at Rikers Island. ""There is no agency that ... has been a more troublesome litigant in terms of, and you will excuse my language, ‘F--- you, judge, I’ll do what I want’ in that period than DOC,” McMahon said in open court.""

 <ref>[]

References

External links

1951 births
Living people
Harvard Law School alumni
Judges of the United States District Court for the Southern District of New York
Ohio State University alumni
Lawyers from Columbus, Ohio
United States district court judges appointed by Bill Clinton
20th-century American judges
21st-century American judges
20th-century American women judges
21st-century American women judges